"Thing for You" is a song by French DJs David Guetta and Martin Solveig. It was released as a single on 12 July 2019 by What a Music. The song was written by David Guetta, Noonie Bao, Alex Hope, Martin Picandet and Sasha Sloan, who is also the vocalist on this track.

Background
Guetta and Solveig have been close friends for several years. In June 2019, while working together in the studio in Ibiza, they teased of a collaboration via Solveig's Instagram account.

Track listing

Charts

References

2019 songs
2019 singles
David Guetta songs
Martin Solveig songs
Songs written by Sasha Alex Sloan
Songs written by David Guetta
Songs written by Martin Solveig
Songs written by Noonie Bao
Songs written by Alex Hope (songwriter)
Song recordings produced by David Guetta
Song recordings produced by Martin Solveig